Sandra Stevens (born 23 November 1944, Leeds, Yorkshire) is an English singer and member of pop group Brotherhood of Man.

Early career 

Sandra Stevens first entered into a singing career in the 1960s when she joined the club band, The Track (who then changed their name to The Nocturnes). The group was formed by drummer Ross Mitchell and among the six members Stevens sang vocals alongside Eve Graham (later of The New Seekers). Based in Manchester, the band played local clubs, performing pop hits of the day such as "The Loco-Motion" and "Da Doo Ron Ron".
In early 1967 Stevens decided to leave the group and was replaced by Lyn Paul (also later of The New Seekers). Over the next few years she sang with the big bands of Joe Loss and Ken MacKintosh and also joined another group, Jason Flocks. Also at this time Stevens was working during the day as a shorthand typist.

Brotherhood of Man 

In 1973, Stevens was performing as the resident singer at the Wakefield Theatre when she came to the attention of Tony Hiller who was looking to recruit a new singer for Brotherhood of Man – a group he was managing. The group were currently performing as a trio (Martin Lee, Lee Sheriden and Nicky Stevens (no relation)) and had released two singles. Stevens took the two singles and listened to them, immediately she was taken by the sound and was keen to join them. In late 1973 Brotherhood of Man became a four-piece with Sandra sharing lead vocals.

It wasn't long before the group released their first single featuring the new line up. In January 1974 "When Love Catches Up on You" was released on Dawn Records and by the end of the year they had scored a European hit with "Lady" and had released an album.

Over the next few years, Stevens enjoyed great success with Brotherhood of Man throughout the world. In 1975 they scored their first number one single and a year later they won the Eurovision Song Contest with the song "Save Your Kisses for Me". The song made No.1 in the UK as well as many other countries and this was followed by two more UK chart toppers, "Angelo" and "Figaro". Although Hiller, Sheriden and Lee wrote the bulk of their material, Stevens is credited as a co-writer on one of their songs: "Let's Love Together", the B-Side to "Save Your Kisses for Me". In over 100 songs recorded, this is the only time that one of the female members of the group received a writing credit.

Stevens continued with Brotherhood of Man, recording lead vocals for many of their biggest hits and performing live with them through the decades. The group is still together and active today, still with the same line-up. They continue to appear in concert and on television.

Personal life 
During the peak of the group's success, Stevens was in a relationship with fellow band member Martin Lee and moved in with him. Due to the young age of many of the group's fans, this was kept largely a secret. In August 1979 they married and are still together today. They have no children and live in Surrey.

References 

1949 births
Living people
Musicians from Leeds
Eurovision Song Contest winners
Eurovision Song Contest entrants of 1976
Stevens, Sandra
Brotherhood of Man members